Armand Castelmary, real name Comte Armand de Castan, born Toulouse 16 August 1834, died New York City 10 February 1897, was a French operatic bass. He created roles in three major premieres at the Paris Opera –  Don Diego in L'Africaine  by Meyerbeer (1865), the Monk in Verdi's  Don Carlos (1867), and Horatio in Ambroise Thomas's Hamlet (1868). Castelmary also appeared at opera houses in England and the United States, and died onstage at the Metropolitan Opera House, New York, during a performance of Martha by Friedrich von Flotow.

Career and death
Armand Castelmary  was a member of the Paris Opera from 1863 to 1870, where he created the three significant roles in the French grand operas listed above. He was married (later divorced) to the soprano Marie Sass, who created the role of Élisabeth in Verdi's Don Carlos. He made his debut at the Royal Opera House, London, in 1889 and sang there in many subsequent seasons. Castelmary toured the United States with several different opera companies in 1870, 1879 and 1890 and made his debut at the Metropolitan Opera in New York in 1893. He died onstage  at the Metropolitan Opera in New York during a performance of Flotow's Martha. The audience, not realising he was suffering a heart attack, thought his physical collapse was a stroke of fine acting and rewarded him with a loud ovation as the curtain was lowered. His Funeral Mass was celebrated on February 10, 1897 at St. Vincent de Paul Church in Manhattan.

Notes

Operatic basses
French basses
19th-century French male opera singers
1834 births
1897 deaths
Musicians who died on stage
Musicians from Toulouse